Deon Horace Davids (born 11 February 1968 in Victoria West, South Africa) is a South African rugby union coach, most recently the head coach of the  Pro14 franchise.

Career

Davids played as a number eight, flanker or lock and spent the majority of his career playing in the Boland Super League, as well as playing for university side . He played for Villagers Worcester, where he also took over as coach, guiding them to the Boland Super League B title in 1998. He also guided Boland College to a title win in 2002 before he was appointed as the assistant coach to Hawies Fourie at provincial side .

With Davids coaching the forwards, Boland Cavaliers won the Currie Cup First Division in 2003 and 2004 and the Vodacom Shield in 2004. When Fourie permanently left to join the  coaching staff in 2007, Davids was appointed as the head coach of the Boland Cavaliers for the 2007 Currie Cup Premier Division, guiding them to seventh spot in the competition. His side reached the quarter finals of the 2007 Vodacom Cup before Davids assisted Chester Williams in coaching the Emerging Springboks side to victory in the 2008 IRB Nations Cup competition held in Romania. Upon his return to South Africa, he once again helped Boland Cavaliers finish in seventh spot in the 2008 Currie Cup Premier Division.

He helped the Boland Cavaliers make another quarter final appearance in the 2008 Vodacom Cup, before he was appointed as the assistant to Eric Sauls for the South Africa Under-20 team that finished third at the 2008 IRB Junior World Championship. The Boland Cavaliers had a disappointing season in the 2009 Currie Cup Premier Division and the Boland Rugby Union decided to appoint Chester Williams as their Director of Rugby, effectively marginalising Davids, who had a contract with the union until 2012.

At the end of 2012, Davids returned to the Western Cape to join the George-based  as the head coach of their academy, and taking charge of the  side. He remained in that role until 2015, when he also assisted the first team, coached by Bevin Fortuin. Within a week of his appointment, the South African Rugby Union announced that Davids would coach the Port Elizabeth-based  Super Rugby franchise in the 2016 Super Rugby season. He would coach them before returning to the SWD Eagles once the Super Rugby season was completed.

References

South African rugby union coaches
Living people
1968 births
People from Victoria West
Sportspeople from the Northern Cape